B. S. Chandrasekhar is a former international cricketer who represented the Indian cricket team between 1964 and 1979. In cricket, a five-wicket haul refers to a bowler taking five or more wickets in a single innings. Chandrasekhar played as a leg spin bowler who formed a part of the Indian spin quartet. Described by West Indies cricketer Viv Richards as the "most difficult" bowler, Chandrasekhar took 16 five-wicket hauls during his international career. He developed an interest in the game when he was a child, watching the playing styles of Australian leg spinner Richie Benaud. Chandrasekhar was affected by polio at the age of five which weakened his right arm. He started as a left-arm bowler but gradually shifted to his withered right arm as it could offer more spin.

Chandrasekhar made his Test debut in 1964 against England at the Brabourne Stadium, claiming four wickets for 67 runs in the first innings. His first five-wicket haul came against West Indies two years later at the same venue. Chandrasekhar's bowling figures of six wickets for 38 runs in 1971 were instrumental in setting up India's first victory in England. It was noted as the Indian "Bowling Performance of the Century" by Wisden in 2002. His bowling performances in the previous English season led to him being named one of the five Wisden Cricketers of the Year in 1972. His career-best figures for an innings were eight wickets for 79 runs against England at the Feroz Shah Kotla Ground in December 1972. Chandrasekhar took a pair of five-wicket hauls for the only time in his career when he took 12 wickets for 104 runs against Australia at the Melbourne Cricket Ground; the performance was effective in ensuring India's first victory in Australia. In Tests, he was most successful against England taking eight fifers.

Chandrasekhar played his only One Day International in February 1976 against New Zealand in Eden Park. He claimed three wickets for 36 runs in the match that India lost by 80 runs.

Key

Tests

Notes

References

General

Specific

Indian cricket lists
Lists of international cricket five-wicket hauls by player